The 2016 UCI Junior Track Cycling World Championships was the annual Junior World Championship for track cycling held at the World Cycling Centre in Aigle, Switzerland from 20 to 24 July 2016.

Medals were won across 19 disciplines.

Medal summary

Notes 
 Held as a demonstration event. No medals were awarded for this discipline.
 Although marked as a record, Italy had won the European title several days prior in 4:29.234.
 Held on a 200m track. Team sprint records are only kept for 250m tracks.

Medal table

References

External links

Organising Committee website 
Results website

UCI Juniors Track World Championships
UCI Juniors Track World Championships, 2016
Track cycling
Sport in the canton of Vaud
International cycle races hosted by Switzerland